Li Haitao (born 29 November 1995) is a Chinese footballer who currently plays for Chinese club Tongji University.

Club career
Li Haitao was promoted to Chinese Super League side Jiangsu Suning's first team squad by Choi Yong-soo in 2017. He made his league debut on 11 November 2018 in a 4–0 home win over Henan Jianye, coming on as a substitute for Gu Chao in the 82nd minute.

Career statistics
.

References

External links
 

1995 births
Living people
Chinese footballers
Footballers from Jiangsu
Jiangsu F.C. players
Suzhou Dongwu F.C. players
Chinese Super League players
China League Two players
Association football goalkeepers